Solana Sierra (born 17 June 2004) is an Argentine tennis player.

Sierra made her Fed Cup debut for Argentina in 2022.

At the 2021 US Open she made the semi-finals in girls' singles. The eventual champion Robin Montgomery defeated Sierra 6–2, 3–6, 4–6. At the 2022 French Open, Solana Sierra made her first junior grand slam final. She lost to Lucie Havlíčková in the final.

Junior career
Junior Grand Slam results - Singles:
 Australian Open: 1R (2022)
 French Open: F (2022)
 Wimbledon: 1R (2021)
 US Open: SF (2021)

Junior Grand Slam results - Doubles:
 Australian Open: 1R (2022)
 French Open: QF (2022)
 Wimbledon: 1R (2021)
 US Open: 1R (2021)

ITF Circuit finals

Singles: 5 (4 titles, 1 runner-up)

Junior Grand Slam Finals

Girls' singles: 1 (runner-up)

Billie Jean King Cup participation

Singles: 2–0

References

External links

2004 births
Living people
Argentine female tennis players
Sportspeople from Mar del Plata
21st-century Argentine women